Pajaritos may refer to:
Pajaritos, Chile
Pajaritos, Nayarit, in the state of Nayarit, Mexico
Pajaritos, San Luis Potosí, in the state of San Luis Potosí, Mexico
Pajaritos, Veracruz, a maritime terminal and petrochemical complex near Coatzacoalcos that located in state of Veracruz, Mexico

See also
 Pajarito (disambiguation)